

Georg Zwade (5 October 1893 – 1968) was an officer in the Wehrmacht of Nazi Germany during World War II who commanded several divisions. 

Zwade fought in the Balkans campaign, on the Eastern Front, in Romania and finally in Italy where he surrendered to the Allies at Belluno. 
He was a recipient of the German Cross in Gold.

Sources
Lexikon der Wehrmacht

1893 births
1968 deaths
Military personnel from Berlin
German Army personnel of World War I
Major generals of the German Army (Wehrmacht)
Recipients of the Gold German Cross
German Army generals of World War II